Marko Đorđević (Serbian Cyrillic: Марко Ђорђевић; born in Belgrade, SR Serbia, SFR Yugoslavia on 6 September 1978) is a retired Serbian alpine skier. He participated at the 1998 and 2002 Winter Olympics. In 1998 he was a flagbearer for Federal Republic of Yugoslavia. His best Olympic result was 26th place in slalom in Salt Lake City.

Olympic results

External links
 Marko Djordjevic at sports references

1978 births
Living people
Alpine skiers at the 2002 Winter Olympics
Alpine skiers at the 1998 Winter Olympics
Olympic alpine skiers of Yugoslavia
Sportspeople from Belgrade
Serbian male alpine skiers